Myelois ossicolor is a species of snout moth. It is found on Cyprus and in Turkey.

The wingspan is about 24 mm.

References

Moths described in 1893
Phycitini